The São Paulo Metropolitan Train is a public transit rail system implanted in Greater São Paulo, serving 23 of its 39 municipalities. It has  of length, 7 lines and 94 stations, transporting approximately 3 million passengers per day. Currently, it is operated by the state-owned company Companhia Paulista de Trens Metropolitanos (CPTM), but two of the lines were auctioned to ViaMobilidade, which began operating their administrations in January 2022.

History

The story of railways in the state of São Paulo begins in 1867 with the construction of the first link between the cities of Santos, São Paulo and Jundiaí by São Paulo Railway, opened on 16 February 1867, which crossed the state plateau and going down the Serra do Mar. In 1946, Estrada de Ferro Santos-Jundiaí, administered by the federal government, assumed the operation of the railway, which is the current lines 7-Ruby and 10-Turquoise.

In the 1870s, the Companhia São Paulo e Rio de Janeiro build the Estrada de Ferro do Norte, a railway that connected São Paulo to cities of the Paraíba Valley. In 1890, this railway was incorporated by Estrada de Ferro Central do Brasil (EFCB), connecting São Paulo to Rio de Janeiro. It is currently divided in lines 11-Coral and 12-Sapphire.

In 1926, EFCB built a variant to the main line call Variante de Poá, which is the current Line 12-Sapphire. On the other side, Estrada de Ferro Sorocaba built, in 1875, a link between the cities of São Paulo and Sorocaba, which is the current Line 8-Diamond. In mid-1937, Estrada de Ferro Sorocabana built a branch, connecting Mairinque to Santos, with the objective to take down the monopoly that São Paulo Railway had in the link between the plateau and the seaside. Later, with the objective to shorten the distance between the capital and Santos, the Jurubatuba branch was built in 1957, which started in Imperatriz Leopoldina station and headed towards Evangelista de Souza station of the Mairinque-Santos branch, forming today, in part, Line 9-Emerald.

In 1957, the federal railway are unified into one state-owned company, Rede Ferroviária Federal (RFFSA), amongst them EFCB and Estrada de Ferro Santos-Jundiaí. The urban sections of RFFSA of all country created in the 1970s the Empresa Brasileira de Transporte Urbano (EBTU), being replaced in 1984 by Companhia Brasileira de Trens Urbanos. In 1971, all of the railways controlled by the state government of São Paulo were unified to become Ferrovia Paulista S/A (FEPASA), amongst them the Estrada de Ferro Sorocabana. Then, FEPASA created FEPASA DRM, which was a child company that operated the commuter transport in the metropolitan regions of the state of São Paulo.

Commuter trains

The first incursion of the state government in the administration of suburban transports occurred in 1934 with the creation of suburban trains by Estrada de Ferro Sorocabana, which invested in electrification and rigging in the suburbs São Paulo-Mairinque and São Paulo-Jurubatuba. After Sorocabana was incorporated by FEPASA in 1971, the Regional Unit of the Suburbs was created, later renamed to Metropolitan Regional Direction. Between 1975 and 1980. FEPASA/DRM developed a great plan of remodeling of the suburbs trains, transformed into metropolitan trains (West and South Lines). Yet, the economic crisis jeopardized the investments and delayed the projects implementations.

At the same time, the suburban trains operated by RFFSA (Lines Santos-Jundiaí, Tronco Mogi and Variante Poá) received modest investments. With that, breakdowns and riots were common, with commuters promoting vandalism in stations, trains and other railway facilities. In 1972, during the discussion of the project of East-West Line, the Metro proposed the transfer of Tronco-Mogi Line and its conversion into a metropolitan train, proposed rejected by RFFSA.

Even with the transfer of the suburban lines from RFFSA to the recently created CBTU, the precariousness of the urban trains administered by the federal government reached a peak in 1987 with the Itaquera rail crash. Caused by the lack of investments and maintenance failures, the accident caused the death of 51 passengers. On 30 April 1987, the state government and the Ministry of Transports signed an intention protocol for the transfer of CBTU East Line-Mogi to the Metro administration. The cost of the transfer and conversion of the line into metropolitan train was of US$ 350 million (almost Cz$ 9 billion) for the state. During the year of 1987, the state government negotiated with the federal government. The lack of state funds and lack of interest of CBTU in the transfer (the company proposed to the state government a shared operation of the lines among CBTU, RFFSA and Metrô) blocked the continuation of the project, besides it was the first step of the acquisition of the network by the state government years later.

System lines 

 Operational extension

 Express services

Future developments

Rolling stock

The metropolitan trains rolling stock has trains of 19 different series, some of them out of service for being older, and some of them recently delivered.

References

Electric railways in Brazil
Transport in São Paulo